The 1930 West Virginia Mountaineers football team was an American football team that represented West Virginia University as an independent during the 1930 college football season. In its sixth and final season under head coach Ira Rodgers, the team compiled a 5–5 record and outscored opponents by a total of 111 to 103. The team played its home games at Mountaineer Field in Morgantown, West Virginia. Walter Gordon was the team captain.

Schedule

References

West Virginia
West Virginia Mountaineers football seasons
West Virginia Mountaineers football